Larisa Akrofie is the founder of Levers in Heels, a website bringing visibility to African women in Science, Technology, Engineering and Mathematics (STEM) through its featured interviews, research, and mentorship programs.

Career 
She is an advocate for African women in STEM and has spoken on various international platforms about women empowerment through STEM education, entrepreneurship and skills development.

Larisa has worked in the areas of education, enterprise and skills development in Ghana.

Education 
Larisa attended Achimota School for her secondary education. She is an alumna of the University of Ghana where she received a bachelor's degree in biomedical engineering.

Awards & Recognitions 

 A former member of the World Economic Forum community of Global Shapers and ex-curator of the Global Shapers community in Accra, Ghana. 
 Listed in 2018 as one of the Top 50 Most Influential Young Ghanaians by Avance Media. 
 2020 National Women in STEM Honours - Supported by the Ministry of Communications, Ghana.
 1st Runner Up of the 2021 'Digital Inclusion & Innovation' category of the Coalition for Digital Equality Awards.
 Finalist of the 2021 'Women Empowerment Award' category of the GhanaWeb Excellence Awards.

References 

Year of birth missing (living people)
Living people
Ghanaian publishers (people)
University of Ghana alumni
Ghanaian women scientists
Ghanaian editors
Ghanaian women editors
Ghanaian curators
Ghanaian women curators
Ghanaian women activists